The Georgia Gazette was a weekly alternative newspaper in Savannah, Georgia that took its name from Georgia's first newspaper, also founded in Savannah in 1763. Its owners and publishers were Marjorie Scardino and Albert Scardino. It was awarded a Pulitzer Prize for Editorial Writing in 1984, the first time in twenty years that such a prize had been bestowed on a weekly newspaper. Despite this recognition, however, the newspaper became financially infeasible to publish and closed in 1985. Albert Scardino went on to write for The New York Times, and Marjorie Scardino later became CEO of Pearson PLC. https://www.thegeorgiagazette.com

References

The Georgia Gazette LLC.
PO Box 2325 Richmond Hill, GA 31324
https://www.thegeorgiagazette.com
https://www.linkedin.com/in/matt-sayle-70059b220

Alternative weekly newspapers published in the United States
Newspapers published in Georgia (U.S. state)
Publications established in 1978